Corymbia jacobsiana, commonly known as Jacob's bloodwood or the stringybark bloodwood, is a species of tree that is endemic to the Northern Territory. It has rough, stringy bark on the trunk and branches, lance-shaped to elliptical or curved adult leaves, flower buds in groups of three or seven, creamy white flowers and urn-shaped fruit.

Description
It has rough, stringy, yellow-brown to grey-brown bark on the trunk and branches. The tree is thought to flower between February and April and the flowers are creamy white. The seeds are flattened, dull to semi-glossy and red or red-brown and saucer-shaped.

Corymbia jacobsiana has no close relatives. It is solated from all other bloodwoods by the combination of rough stringybark and sparsely hairy juvenile leaves, carpeted on the underside with white hairs.

Taxonomy and naming
Jacob's bloodwood was first formally described by the botanist William Blakely in 1934 in his book, A Key to the Eucalypts and given the name Eucalyptus jacobsiana. Jacobs was a distinguished forester and the Principal of the Australian Forestry School in Canberra from 1945 to 1961. Botanists Ken Hill and Lawrie Johnson were the first to define the genus Corymbia in 1995, identifying the bloodwoods, ghost gums and spotted gums as a group distinct from Eucalyptus. They changed the name of this species to Corymbia jacobsiana.

Distribution
Corymbia jacobsiana occurs throughout the top end of the Northern Territory, usually in monsoonal woodland areas and usually as part of a tropical savannah woodland mix with eucalypts and cypress, growing in sand or clay soils or in dissected sandstone. It has an erratic distribution around Pine Creek, Tipperary Station and further east in Arnhem Land, often found with Corymbia arnhemensis and C. nesophila.

The plant's rhizomes allow it to form dense clones following fires, and that later thin out to form woodlands.

See also
 List of Corymbia species

References

jacobsiana
Myrtales of Australia
Flora of the Northern Territory
Plants described in 1934